Kinyongia uluguruensis is a species of chameleon, also known as the Uluguru two-horned chameleon or Uluguru two-horned chamaeleon. It is endemic to Tanzania.

References

Kinyongia
Reptiles of Tanzania
Endemic fauna of Tanzania
Reptiles described in 1957
Taxa named by Arthur Loveridge